Herbert Matter (April 25, 1907 – May 8, 1984) was a Swiss-born American photographer and graphic designer known for his pioneering use of photomontage in commercial art. Matter's innovative and experimental work helped shape the vocabulary of 20th-century graphic design.

Biography
He worked with Adolphe Mouron Cassandre, Le Corbusier and Deberny & Peignot. In 1932, he returned to Zurich, where he designed posters for the Swiss National Tourist Office and Swiss resorts. The travel posters won instant international acclaim for his pioneering use of photomontage combined with typeface.

He went to the United States in 1936 and was hired by legendary art director Alexey Brodovitch. Work for Harper's Bazaar, Vogue and other magazines followed. In the 1940s, photographers, including Irving Penn, at Vogues studios at 480 Lexington Avenue often used them for shooting the advertising work commissioned by outside clients. The practice was at first tolerated, but by 1950 it was banned on the grounds that it "has interfered with our own interests and has been a severe handicap to our editorial operations". In response Matter and three other Condé Nast photographers Serge Balkin, Constantin Joffé and Geoffrey Baker left to establish Studio Enterprises Inc. in the former House & Garden studio on 37th Street (Penn stayed on but also left in 1952).

From 1946 to 1966 Matter was design consultant with Knoll Associates. He worked closely with Charles and Ray Eames. From 1952 to 1976 he was professor of photography at Yale University and from 1958 to 1968 he served as design consultant to the Solomon R. Guggenheim Museum in New York and the Museum of Fine Arts in Houston. He was elected to the New York Art Director's Club Hall of Fame in 1977, received a Guggenheim Fellowship in photography in 1980 and the AIGA medal in 1983.

As a photographer, Matter won acclaim for his purely visual approach. A master technician, he used every method available to achieve his vision of light, form and texture. Manipulation of the negative, retouching, cropping, enlarging and light drawing are some of the techniques he used to achieve the fresh form he sought in his still lifes, landscapes, nudes and portraits. As a filmmaker, he directed two films on his friend Alexander Calder: "Sculptures and Constructions" in 1944 and "Works of Calder" (with music by John Cage) for the Museum of Modern Art in 1950.

Close friends of Matter and his wife Mercedes were the painters Jackson Pollock, Willem de Kooning, fellow Swiss photographer Robert Frank and Alberto Giacometti. Matter's wife Mercedes was the daughter of the American modernist painter Arthur Beecher Carles, and was herself the chief founder of the New York Studio School.

"The absence of pomposity was characteristic of this guy", said another designer, Paul Rand, about Matter. His creative life was devoted to narrowing the gap between so-called fine and applied arts. Matter died on May 8, 1984, in Southampton, New York.

Bibliography
 Herbert Matter: Modernist Photography and Graphic Design (paperback) by Jeffrey Head. Design and typsetting by John Hill. Exhibition catalog published by Stanford University Libraries 2005.
 "History of Writing Non-Alphabetic Systems of Writing", Baseline International Typographics Magazine, no. 41, 2003, pp. 33–36 by Jeffrey Head
 "Herbert Matter: The Art of Photo-Graphics" by Kerry William Purcell, Baseline, No. 49, 2006
 "The Crafty Linotyper" (extract), by Kerry William Purcell. Eye, No. 55, 2005
The Visual Language of Herbert Matter (2009), documentary film on the life and work of Matter

References

External links

Art Directors Club biography, portrait, and images of work
Herbert Matter Photographs at the Stanford University Libraries

 
 , posted by the Calder Foundation 
Yale Collection of Herbert Matter (MS 1630). Manuscripts and Archives, Yale University Library.

1907 births
1984 deaths
People from Obwalden
20th-century American photographers
American graphic designers
AIGA medalists
Swiss emigrants to the United States
Yale University faculty